Give may refer to: making someone get or receive something from someone

Places
 Give, Denmark, a small town
 Give Municipality, a former municipality

Music
 Give (Balkan Beat Box album), 2012 album by Balkan Beat Box
 Give (The Bad Plus album), the third studio album by The Bad Plus
 "Give" (song), the third single by American country recording artist LeAnn Rimes
 "Give" aka "Still Yawning Still Born" a song by Steve Peregrin Took recorded acoustically by his band Shagrat in 1971 and by Took solo in 1972 - released 1992/1995
 Give (EP), a 1998 EP and single by American rock band Cold

See also
 GAVE (disambiguation)
 Given (disambiguation)
 Giver (disambiguation)
 Giving (disambiguation)